Kollau is a small river of Hamburg, Germany. It flows into the Tarpenbek near Hamburg-Lokstedt.

See also
List of rivers of Hamburg

Rivers of Hamburg
Rivers of Germany